Penelope Muse Abernathy (born August 28, 1951) is an American journalist and author who specializes in the study of news deserts. Until December 2020, she served as the Knight Chair in Journalism and Digital Media Economics at the Hussman School of Journalism and Media at the University of North Carolina at Chapel Hill.

Education

Abernathy received a bachelor's degree in history with a secondary emphasis in English literature and journalism from the University of North Carolina at Greensboro in 1972. She earned her M.B.A. from Columbia University in 1985. In 2003, Abernathy completed her master's degree in journalism from Columbia University.

Career

Between 1969 and 1984, she worked as a reporter or editor at various newspapers such as The Charlotte Observer, The Dallas Times-Herald, and The Wichita Eagle-Beacon.

From 1986 to 1999, Abernathy held several positions with The New York Times. She was the senior vice-president strategic planning and human resources, which made her responsible for planning a number of major business initiatives that included the nationwide distribution expansion that began in 1997. Abernathy was also president of the News Services Division, where she created a new media division.

Abernathy was a publisher for the Harvard Business Review between 1999 and 2002.

In 2004, Abernathy was promoted to a Senior Vice-President at The Wall Street Journal and was responsible for the business operations of the newspaper's international publications.

Abernathy is currently a visiting professor at the Medill School, Northwestern University and previously was Knight Chair in Journalism and Digital Media Economics at the Hussman School of Journalism and Media at the University of North Carolina at Chapel Hill.

Research 
Abernathy's research has been devoted to the impact of news deserts and developing business models that would help to sustain community journalism. In Abernathy's report, “The Expanding News Desert” she explored the decline of local newspapers, the implications for communities and democracy, and how to stop the rise of news deserts.

Abernathy also examined how ownership of newspapers throughout the nation has changed as many of them have been purchased by investment groups. The report explores how this change has occurred and what this means for accountability and transparency. Lastly, the report examines how the rise of news deserts, along with an increase in investment groups owning newspapers, has impacted community journalism Some of the major trends the report highlighted include: a willingness to sell or close under-performing newspapers, establishment of an annual target for profit margin, a blurred line between the local newspapers’ responsibility to readers and advertisers, increased willingness to declare bankruptcy, and a lack of commitment to the historically served communities.

Publications

In 2009, Abernathy co-authored “The News Landscape in 2014: Transformed or Diminished?,” which was a report that analyzes the economic situation of news organizations from the perspective of shareholders, journalists and economists.

“Saving Community Journalism: The Path to Profitability” was published in 2014. The book was based on five years of research involving more than two dozen newspapers, and it was designed to help stakeholders implement new strategies for long-term profitability. The research in this book became the foundation for the UNC Center for Innovation and Sustainability in Local Media.

Abernathy co-authored “The Strategic Digital Media Entrepreneur,” published in 2018, which focused on how the Internet has changed business models in the media; leadership challenges and opportunities that face media entrepreneurs; and help to develop strategies to create new and sustainable business models.

“The rise of a New Media Baron and the Emerging Threat of News Deserts” was published in 2016. The report shows the significant political, social, and economic consequences of the emergence of news deserts across the United States.

References

Living people
University of North Carolina at Greensboro alumni
Columbia Business School alumni
The New York Times people
20th-century American women writers
American journalism academics
20th-century American journalists
American women journalists
The Wall Street Journal people
1951 births
American women academics
21st-century American women
University of North Carolina at Chapel Hill faculty
Columbia University Graduate School of Journalism alumni